Righi may refer to:

People 

Righi is an Italian surname. Notable people with the surname include:

 Aldo Righi (born 1947), Italian pole vaulter 
 Andrea Righi (born 1979), Italian freestyle swimmer
 Augusto Righi (1850–1920), Italian physicist
 Daniele Righi (born 1976), Italian cyclist
 Egano Righi-Lambertini (1906-2000), Italian Roman Catholic titular archbishop of Doclea and Vatican diplomat
 Edoardo Righi (1926-2019), Italian athlete
 Esteban Righi (1938-2019), Argentine lawyer and politician
 Italo Righi (born 1959), Captain Regent of San Marino, from April 1, 2012 to October 1, 2012, with Maurizio Rattini
 John Righi (1469–1539), Franciscan hermit
 Stefano Righi (born 1960), Italian singer, songwriter, musician, record producer and actor
 Tommaso Righi (1727–1802), Italian sculptor and stuccator with a practice in Rome
 Vinícius Lopes Righi (born 1964), former Brazilian football player
 Vittore Ugo Righi (1919–1980), Vatican diplomat and author

Places
 Righi, Genoa, a hill in the Italian city of Genoa
 Greek name for Reggio Calabria

Science
 Righi-Leduc Effect, the heat flow resulting from a perpendicular temperature gradient and vice versa
 Righi oscillator, a spark-gap oscillator invented by Augusto Righi
 16766 Righi, a main-belt asteroid

Other uses 
 Zecca–Righi funicular, an Italian funicular railway connecting Genoa to the Largo della Zecca

See also 

 Rigi, mountain in central Switzerland

Italian-language surnames